Peter White MBE (born 1947, Winchester) is a visually impaired British broadcast journalist and DJ.

Broadcasting career
Blind since birth (as was his elder brother), he attended New College Worcester, which was then known as the Worcester College for the Blind. He was a regular presenter on BBC Radio Solent from the station's launch in 1971 until November 2006, when he was downsized.

He currently presents (with others) You and Yours and (since 1974) In Touch (both BBC Radio 4), a programme for blind and partially sighted people, and regularly contributes to other science, news or educational programmes to talk about disabilities. He was the presenter of Channel 4's Same Difference (1987–1989) and Central Television's Link (1989–1991). He was made the BBC's Disability Affairs Correspondent in 1995. He was part of the reporting team for BBC News at the 2008 Beijing games. A column by White for The Guardian 'G2' magazine which appeared on 8 September 2006 provoked many positive responses.

Charity work

On 13 March 2009 White participated in Radio 4's Stand Up With The Stars, a competition for Red Nose Day 2009 where well-known, serious presenters from Radio 4 (including Evan Davis, Libby Purves and Laurie Taylor), attempted to make and deliver a stand-up comedy routine, mentored by other well-known comedy presenters on Radio 4. He went on to win after a vote from Radio 4 listeners. Much of his routine focused on his blindness and others' perceptions of blind people.

In February 2011, White took part in a 100 km trek across the Kaisut Desert in North Kenya for Comic Relief to raise awareness of individuals in Africa losing their sight to diseases like glaucoma. Despite painful blisters he finished the challenges, crossing the line first with actress Kira Tointon.

Awards and achievements
1988 Appointed Member of the Order of the British Empire (MBE).
1999 Published an autobiography, See It My Way.
2001 Awarded Sony speech Broadcaster of the Year 2001
2002 Awarded Viv Bradford Rose Bowl by Warwickshire Association for the Blind

References

External links
 

1947 births
English blind people
English male journalists
Living people
Members of the Order of the British Empire
Mass media people from Winchester
English male non-fiction writers
Alumni of the University of Kent
Television presenters with disabilities